Agathotoma finitima is a species of sea snail, a marine gastropod mollusk in the family Mangeliidae.

Description
The length of the shell attains 6 mm, its diameter 2.3 mm.

Distribution
This species occurs in the Pacific Ocean from Nicaragua to Peru.

References

 Pilsbry, Henry Augustus, and Herbert N. Lowe. "West Mexican and Central American mollusks collected by HN Lowe, 1929-31." Proceedings of the Academy of Natural Sciences of Philadelphia (1932): 33-144.

External links
  Tucker, J.K. 2004 Catalog of recent and fossil turrids (Mollusca: Gastropoda). Zootaxa 682:1-1295.
 

finitima
Gastropods described in 1932